Jens Jessen Rasmussen, also known as James Rasmussen (born 29 September 1835 on Langeland) in was a member of the Wisconsin State Assembly.

Biography
Rasmussen was born on the island of Langeland, Denmark on September 29, 1835. He moved to what is now Milwaukee, Wisconsin in 1847 before settling in Brown County, Wisconsin in 1849.

Career
Rasmussen was a member of the Assembly in 1881 and 1883. Also in 1881, Rasmussen was a candidate for the Wisconsin State Senate. In addition, Rasmussen was Chairman (often similar to Mayor) of New Denmark, Wisconsin and of Ashwaubenon, Wisconsin, as well as Chairman of the County Board. He was a Republican.

References

People from Langeland Municipality
Danish emigrants to the United States
Politicians from Milwaukee
People from New Denmark, Wisconsin
County supervisors in Wisconsin
Mayors of places in Wisconsin
1833 births
Year of death missing
People from Ashwaubenon, Wisconsin
Republican Party members of the Wisconsin State Assembly